A Tee hangar is a type of enclosed structure designed to hold aircraft in protective storage, and their shape takes advantage of the shape of most general aviation aircraft where the main wings are longer than the horizontal stabilizer. This type of hangar is also known as Tee-hangar, T hangar or T-hangar. Typically constructed of metal, they are primarily used for private aircraft at general aviation airports because they are more economical than rectangular hangars. There are two types of Tee hangars: standard (sometimes called stacked) and nested. 

Standard Tee hangars provide additional storage area and can use rolling doors.  In the diagram, the odd-shaped areas at the end of the hangar clusters may be omitted, may be included as part of the end hangars, or may be used as segregated storage, shop or office space.

Nested Tee hangars require less building material than standard and are wider, but shorter, thereby reducing the length of taxiway required to abut the building. The disadvantage is that rolling doors cannot be used, as the rolling door would cover the neighboring hangar doors when opened.

External links 
 Introducing the New Silver T Hangar – Flying
 Hangar on Skids – Flying
 Build Your Own Hangar – Flying
 Fulfab T-Hangars – Flying
 Novel Hangar – Aviation News

Aircraft hangars